Library history is a subdiscipline within library science and library and information science focusing on the history of libraries and their role in societies and cultures. Some see the field as a subset of information history. Library history is an academic discipline and should not be confused with its object of study (history of libraries): the discipline is much younger than the libraries it studies. Library history begins in ancient societies through contemporary issues facing libraries today.   Topics include recording mediums, cataloguing systems, scholars, scribes, library supporters and librarians.

Earliest libraries
The earliest records of a library institution as it is presently understood can be dated back to around 5,000 years ago in the Southwest Asian regions of the world.  One of the oldest libraries found is that of the ancient library at Ebla (circa 2500 BCE) in present-day Syria. In the 1970s, the excavation at Ebla's library unearthed over 20,000 clay tablets written in cuneiform script.

The Al Qarawiyyin Library was founded in 859 by Fatima al-Fihri and is the oldest working library in the world. It is in Fez, Morocco and is part of the oldest continually operating university in the world, the University of al-Qarawiyyin. The library houses approximately 4,000 ancient Islamic manuscripts. These manuscripts include 9th century Qurans and the oldest known accounts of the Islamic prophet Muhammed.

Library in Mesopotamia 
The Assyrian King Assurbanipal created one of the greatest libraries in Nineveh in the seventh century BCE. The collection consisted of over 30,000 tablets written in a variety of languages. The collection was cataloged both by the shape of the tablet and by the subject of the content (Murray, 2009, p. 8-9). The library had separate rooms for the different topics: government, history, law, astronomy, geography, and so on.  The tablets also contained myths, hymns, and even jokes. Assurbanipal would send scribes to visit every corner of his kingdom to copy the content of other libraries. His library contained many of the most important literary works of the day, including the epic of Gilgamesh. Assurbanipal's Royal Library also had one of the first library catalogs. Unfortunately, Nineveh was eventually destroyed and the library was lost in a fire.

Libraries in Ancient Greece 
The Greek government was the first to sponsor public libraries. By 500 BCE both Athens and Samos had begun creating libraries for the public, though as most of the population was illiterate these spaces were serving a small, educated portion of the community (Murray, 2009, p. 14). Athens developed a city archive at the Metroon in 405 BCE, where documents were stored in sealed jars. These would have saved the documents, but they would have been difficult to consult regularly. In Paros around the same time, contracts were placed in the temple for safe keeping, and a Book curse was placed for extra protection.

Library of Alexandria 
The library at Alexandria, Egypt, was renowned in the third century BCE while kings Ptolemy I Soter and Ptolemy II Philadelphus reigned. The library included a museum, garden, meeting areas and of course reading rooms (Lyons, 2011, p. 26-27). The Great Library, as it is known, was one of many in Alexandria. Beginning at its inception through the first century BCE Alexandria was a well known center for learning, the quantity and quality of the libraries speak to this renown (Murray, 2009, p. 17). Alexandria was the intellectual capital of the Western world through the third century CE. According to a primary source, every ship that came to Alexandria was required to hand over their books to be copied, and the copies would be returned to the owner. The library would keep the original. The librarians at Alexandria collected, copied, and organized scrolls from all around. The Library of Alexandria was damaged by various disasters over time, including fire and earthquake. While there are popular stories about how the library was burned, most of these are more myth than fact.

Libraries in Rome 
Julius Caesar and his successor Augustus were the first to establish public libraries in ancient Rome, including the library of Apollo on the Palatine Hill. Roman aristocrats also had personal libraries, which usually contained works in both Greek and Latin. The average Roman would not have been familiar with books.

Libraries in the Middle Ages 
It wasn't until the Middle Ages that libraries became a part of culture. Many of these libraries were connected to a monastery or religious institution. Books could not be borrowed from these libraries and were generally chained to the shelves to prevent theft.

During the Renaissance era, more people became educated and relied on libraries as a place to study and gain knowledge. During the Renaissance most of the text held in libraries were religious text. Libraries helped enrich the culture of those who were educated by providing this valuable resource otherwise unavailable.

Journals
Libraries & the Cultural Record; exploring the history of collections of recorded knowledge (L & C R); until 2006: Libraries & Culture; until 1988: The Journal of Library History; until 1974: Journal of Library History, Philosophy, and Comparative Librarianship; until 1973: The Journal of Library History
Library & Information History (until 2008: Library History; until 1967: Library Association. Library History Group. Newsletter) 
Library History Review
Library History Round Table Newsletter (L H R T Newsletter), until 1992: L H R T Newsletter; until 198?: L H R T; until 1979: A L H R T Newsletter
Information and Culture; a journal of history
Libraries: Culture, History, and Society;  peer-reviewed journal of the Library History Round Table of the American Library Association

Library history reports and writings of the early 19th and 20th century
In the early 19th and 20th century, representative titles were created reporting library history in the United States and the United Kingdom. American titles include Public Libraries in the United States of America, Their History, Condition, and Management (1876), Memorial History of Boston (1881) by Justin Winsor, Public Libraries in America (1894) by William I. Fletcher, and History of the New York Public Library (1923) by Henry M. Lydenberg. British titles include Old English Libraries (1911) by Earnest A. Savage and The Chained Library: A Survey of Four Centuries in the Evolution of the English Library by Burnett Hillman Streeter.

In the beginning of the 20th century, library historians began applying scientific research methodologies to examine the library as a social agency. Two works that demonstrate this argument are Geschichte der Bibliotheken (1925) by Alfred Hessel and the Library Quarterly article from 1931, “The Sociological Beginnings of the Library Movement in America” by Arnold Borden.
 
With the establishment of library schools, master's theses and doctoral dissertations represented the shift in serious research regarding libraries and library history. Two published doctoral dissertations that mark this trend are Foundations of the Public Library: The Origins of the American Public Library Movement in New England, 1629 – 1855 (1940) by Jesse Shera and Arsenals of a Democratic Culture: A Social History of the American Public Library Movement in New England and the Middle Atlantic States From 1850 to 1900 (1947). Additional models of library historical analysis include The New York Public Library: A History of Its Founding and Early Years by Phyllis Dain, a work that exemplified institutional history and The Power and the Dignity: Librarianship and Katharine L. Sharp by Laurel Grotzinger, a biographical study.

Edward A. Goedeken, writes a biennial review of publications on the history of libraries, librarianship, and information surveys that is published in the journal,  Information & Culture  

Cataloging
The earliest methods of cataloging involved storing tablets separately based on their content. The subject matter was identified by small descriptions or 
color coding. Common practice was to have different rooms or chambers for the various subject types. Moving to the Renaissance period, cataloging took on a whole new level. Materials were still stored by content, but now titles were being listed and organized alphabetically. Catalogs were kept in ledger form listing all the materials in the collection, new additions added at the margins, until a librarian would redraft the catalog. Maintaining and revising the catalog became crucially important as collections grew. It was during the Renaissance period that one would find the first catalogs that referenced other collections to make finding materials easier. As printing grew, so did the need for accurate catalogs of material available. Additionally catalogs needed to be descriptive enough to help librarians in the locating and storing of books. As collections grew, so naturally did catalogs. Materials continued to be separated by subject and would then be further divided by more specific heading, still listed and stored within these sub headings alphabetically.

Catalogs were not standardized until the late 19th century and even in the 1800s some libraries had no actual record of their holdings or relied on a brief author list. Much “finding” done in libraries at the time relied on the memory of the librarian.day was a printed book. Printed book catalogs had the same advantages as books themselves: They could be produced in multiple copies and were highly portable. A library could give a copy of its catalog to another library, thus making it possible for users to discover, at a distance, that a library had the item sought. The disadvantages of the printed book catalog, however, became more serious as library collections grew and the rate of growth increased. A library catalog needed near-constant updating. Yet the time required to produce a printed book catalog (in an era in which printing required that each page be typeset) meant that the catalog could be seriously out of date as it came off the press. Updating such a catalog meant reprinting it in its entirely, or staving off an expensive new edition by producing supplementary volumes of newly acquired works, which then made searching quite tedious. In the mid-1800s the library card catalog was already winning hearts and minds. Although neither the book catalog nor the card catalog meets all needs as efficiently as one would desire, the card catalog had already proven itself as an up-to-date instrument for library users and librarians alike.Cards were lauded by Melvil Dewey (1851–1931) in his introduction to early editions of his Decimal Classification, although his classification and “relativ index” in no way required the use of a card system. However, the “Co-Operation Committee” of the newly formed American Library Association (ALA) announced its decision on the standardization of the catalog card in 1877; not coincidentally, Dewey’s library service company, The Library Bureau, founded in 1876, was poised to provide the cards to libraries at a cost lower than custom-produced card stock.The typewriter brought greater uniformity to the card catalog than even the neatest “library hand” could, and undoubtedly increased the amount of information that one could squeeze into the approximate three-by-five surface. When the Library of Congress (LC) developed printed card sets using the ALA standard size and offered them for sale starting in 1902, the use of the card catalog in US libraries was solidified.After Dewey, the person who had the greatest effect on library technology was Henriette Avram (1919–2006), creator of the Machine Readable Cataloging (MARC) format. This was not only an innovation in terms of library technology, it was generally innovative in terms of the computing capability of the time. In the mid-1960s, when MARC was under development, computer capabilities for handling textual data were very crude. For example, look at a magazine mailing label. You will see uppercase characters only, limited field sizes, and often a lack of punctuation beyond perhaps a hash mark for apartment numbers. This is what all data looked like in 1965. However, libraries needed to represent actual document titles, author names, and languages other than English. This meant that the library data record needed to have variable length fields, full punctuation, and diacritical marks. Avram delivered a standard that was definitely ahead of its time. Although the primary focus of the standard was to automate the printing of cards for LC’s card service, Avram worked with staff at LC and other libraries involved in the project to leverage the MARC record for other uses, such as the local printing of “new books” lists.Dewey did not anticipate the availability of the LC printed card service when he proposed the standardization of the library catalog card, yet it was precisely that standardization that made it possible for libraries across America to add LC printed cards to their catalogs. Likewise, Avram did not anticipate the creation of the computerized online catalog during her early work on the MARC format, but it was the existence of years of library cataloging in a machine-readable form that made the Online Public Access Catalog (OPAC) a possibility.

Wartime librarianship
In World War II, American librarians and archivists played a major role in collecting published information about Nazi Germany, and also rescuing stolen books and documents the Nazis stole from target countries and from Jews. Archibald MacLeish, the Librarian of Congress, announced that fellow librarians "must become active and not passive agents of the democratic process." The Office of Strategic Services (OSS) took the lead in recruiting and organizing secret expeditions to Europe, often acquiring rare materials from bookshops just before the Gestapo arrived. Massive amounts of books, magazines and documents were collected—too much to transport—so the new technique of micro photography was developed successfully.

After the D-Day landings in 1944, librarians became part of information search teams under Army command, searching especially for current intelligence, as well as patents and technical manuals. Back in Washington, analysts mined the information for projects such as targeting key industrial centers, railroads and chokepoints, and identifying concentration camps and prisoner of war facilities.

When Berlin fell, there was a rush to obtain documentation of top-secret German military research. Furthermore the teams rescued over two million books stolen from libraries, and 160,000 Jewish books stolen by the Nazis. According to Ernest Hilbert, librarian historian Kathy Peiss shows how the librarians delivered intelligence about enemy technology, propaganda, and infrastructure. They also advanced librarianship, introducing an air of mass foreign acquisitions, widespread film usage, and new techniques for rapidly extracting vital information instead of merely storing.Robert Hilbert, "Librarians at war" Wall Street Journal Feb. 21, 2020

Awards
 Phyllis Dain Library History Award
 Donald G. Davis Article Award
 Eliza Atkins Gleason Book Award
 Justin Winsor Library History Essay Award

See also
 Andrew Carnegie
 History of the Internet
 History of libraries
 History of public library advocacy
 Information history
 Librarian
 Librarians in popular culture
 Libraries & the Cultural Record
 Library
 Library historian
 List of librarians
 List of libraries
 Scribe
 Sociology of the Internet

References

Further reading
 Campbell, James W.P. The Library: A World History. (University Of Chicago Press, 2013).
 Goedeken, Edward A. "Being Part of the Conversation: The Most Cited Articles in Library History and Library & Information History, 1967–2015," Library & Information History 33, no. 1 (2017): 3–18.
Goedeken, Edward A. 2019. “The Literature of American Library History, 2016–2017.” Information & Culture 54 (3): 342–80.
Goedeken, Edward A. 2018. “The Literature of American Library History, 2014-2015.” Information & Culture 53 (1): 85–120.
Goedeken, Edward A. 2016. “The Literature of American Library History, 2012-2013.” Information & Culture 51 (2): 268–98.
Goedeken, Edward A. 2013. “The Literature of American Library History, 2010-2011.” Information & Culture 48 (4): 506–36.
Goedeken, Edward A. 2011. “The Literature of American Library History, 2008-2009.” Libraries & the Cultural Record 46 (4): 412–41.
Goedeken, Edward A. 2009. “The Literature of American Library History, 2006-2007.” Libraries & the Cultural Record 44 (4): 434–70.
Goedeken, Edward A. 2008. “The Literature of American Library History, 2003-2005.” Libraries & the Cultural Record 43 (4): 440–80
Goedeken, Edward A. 2004. “The Literature of American Library History, 2001-2002.” Libraries & Culture 39 (2): 175–211.
Goedeken, Edward A. 2002. “The Literature of American Library History, 1999-2000.” Libraries & Culture 37 (2): 138–74.
Goedeken, Edward A. 2000. “The Literature of American Library History, 1997-1998.” Libraries & Culture 35 (2): 311–53.
Goedeken, Edward A. 1998. “The Literature of American Library History, 1995-1996.” Libraries & Culture 33 (4): 407–45.
Goedeken, Edward A. 1996. “The Literature of American Library History, 1993-1994.” Libraries & Culture 31: 603–44.
 Hildenbrand, Suzanne. Reclaiming the American library past: Writing the women in (Ablex, 1996). 
Krummel, D.W. Fiat lux, fiat latebra: a celebration of historical library functions. Graduate School of Library and Information Science. University of Illinois.Occasional Paper 209.August, 1999.
 Mehra, Bharat, et al. Encyclopedia of library and information sciences (2009).
 Murray, Stuart A.P. The library: An illustrated history (Skyhorse Publishing, Inc., 2013).
 Pawley, Christine. "History in the library and information science curriculum: Outline of a debate." Libraries & Culture 40.3 (2005): 223-238. online
 Peiss, Kathy Information hunters : when librarians, soldiers, and spies banded together in World War II Europe (Oxford University Press, 2020).
Wellisch, Hans H. “Ebla: The World's Oldest Library.” The Journal of Library History, vol. 16, no. 3, 1981, pp. 488–500.
 Wiegand, Wayne A., & Davis, Donald G., eds. Encyclopedia of library history. (Garland, 1994). 
 Wiegand, Wayne A. "American library history literature, 1947-1997: theoretical perspectives?." Libraries & Culture'' (2000): 4-34. in JSTOR

External links
 American Library Association (ALA) - Library History Roundtable (LHRT)
 Chartered Institute of Library and Information Professionals (CILIP) - Library and Information History Group
 International Federation of Library Associations (IFLA) - Library History Special Interest Group

 
Information science